Aatmabalam is a 1985 Indian Telugu-language musical thriller film, produced by J. M. Naidu, K. Muthayala Rao under the Sri Valli Productions banner and directed by Tatineni Prasad. The film stars Nandamuri Balakrishna and Bhanupriya, with music composed by Chakravarthy. It is a remake of the Hindi film Karz (1980).

Plot 
The film begins with Anand Kumar Bhupathi a tycoon who is victorious over their antagonist Puligaolla Varhavataram in the legal battle. In that carnival atmosphere, he knits his love interest, Maya, a fortune-hunter one that in cahoots with Varhavataram. Now, the newlywed proceeds to their estate for the blessing of Anand's mother Rani Vijaya Durga Devi. In between, vicious Maya slays her husband near a temple of Goddess Kaali when deranged Durga Devi dictates the goddess to give back her son. Years roll by, and Durga Prasad a famous pop singer is the reincarnation of Anand and he crushes on a beauty Vaishali. Once, in his show, he performs a tune allured by Anand which haunts him of his previous life memories. After his medical checkup, his doctor suggests that he should relax for a while.

Hence, Durga Prasad goes on vacation and being unbeknownst to meet Vaishali he lands at Anand's estate. Indeed, Vaishali is an orphan reared by Maya owing to the extortion of her uncle Kabir Dada who is in jail. Then, step-by-step Durga Prasad retrieves the past. He also learns Maya has expelled his mother and sister Pankajavalli / Pinky after his death. Meanwhile, Kabir acquits and he rearwards Durga Prasad that he has a bit of knowledge regarding the undercover mystery of the Kaali temple. Here, Durga Prasad completes the remaining, revealing his identity which makes Kabir bewilder. Afterward, he finds the whereabouts of his mother & sister and unites them. At this point, Durga Prasad snares, confuses, horrifies Maya, and makes her confess the crime. In a jiffy, Varhavataram seizes Durga Devi, Pinky, & Vaishali but Durga Prasad rescues them and ceases his. At last, Maya dies falling into the same cliff never Kaali temple. Finally, the movie ends on a happy note with the marriage of Durga Prasad & Vaishali.

Cast 
Nandamuri Balakrishna as Anand Kumar Bhupathi (second life) / Durga Prasad
Bhanupriya as Vaishali
Satyanarayana as Kabir
Sarath Babu as Anand Kumar Bhupathi (first life)
M. N. Nambiar as Puligaolla Varhavataraam
Mikkilineni as P. J. Naidu
Hari Prasad as Hari
Telephone Satyanarayana
Silk Smita as Mayadevi
Anjali Devi as Rani Vijaya Durga Devi
Deepa as Pankajavalli / Pinky

Soundtrack 
Music was composed by Chakravarthy. Lyrics were written by Veturi.

References

External links 

1980s Telugu-language films
1985 films
Films about reincarnation
Indian supernatural thriller films
Indian mystery thriller films
Indian mystery drama films
Films about revenge
Films directed by T. L. V. Prasad
Films scored by K. Chakravarthy
Telugu remakes of Hindi films
Indian remakes of American films
Films based on American novels